Edward Robinson (born 1828 - January 3, 1888) was an Ontario lawyer and political figure. He represented Kent West in the Legislative Assembly of Ontario as a Liberal member from 1879 to 1883.

He was born in County Roscommon, Ireland in 1829 and educated at Trinity College in Dublin. He came to Toronto in 1854 as head of the mathematics department of the Toronto Grammar School. Robinson later articled in law, was admitted as an attorney in 1863 and became a partner of Walter McCrea at Chatham. In 1864, he married Charlotte Miller.

External links 
The Canadian parliamentary companion and annual register, 1881 CH Mackintosh

1829 births
1888 deaths
Ontario Liberal Party MPPs
Irish emigrants to Canada
Politicians from County Roscommon